Horace Edward Ramsden VC (15 December 1878 – 3 August 1948) was a South African recipient of the Victoria Cross, the highest and most prestigious award for gallantry in the face of the enemy that can be awarded to British and Commonwealth forces. He was awarded the VC for saving his brother's life.

Details 

Ramsden was 21 years old, and a Trooper in the Protectorate Regiment (N.W. Cape Colony), South African Forces during the Second Boer War when the following deed took place near Mafeking for which he was awarded the VC:

Death
Ramsden died on 3 August 1948 at Wynberg, Cape Town, and was cremated at the Maitland Crematorium, Maitland, Cape Town.

The medal 

The medal was sold by auction in South Africa through Stephan Welz and Co. (incorporating Sotheby's) on 25 October 1999 and was purchased by Lord Ashcroft.

References 

 Monuments to Courage (David Harvey, 1999)
 The Register of the Victoria Cross (This England, 1997)
Victoria Crosses of the Anglo-Boer War (Ian Uys, 2000)

External links 

 VC medal auction details
 

1878 births
1948 deaths
Emigrants from the United Kingdom to Cape Colony
South African people of British descent
Second Boer War recipients of the Victoria Cross
South African recipients of the Victoria Cross
British colonial army soldiers
British military personnel of the Second Boer War
People from Chester
South African military personnel of World War I
Military personnel from Chester